The 2020 1. deild karla (English: Men's First Division) is the 66th season of second-tier Icelandic football. Twelve teams contest the league. The season began on 19 June.

Teams
The league was contested by twelve clubs. Eight remained in the division from the 2019 season.

League table

Results

References

External links
 Fixtures at ksí.is

1. deild karla (football) seasons
Iceland
Iceland
2